Negros del Norte was a province of the Philippines, located within the Western Visayas region. It existed in 1986 and was abolished later the same year. The law establishing the province was nullified by the Supreme Court of the Philippines on August 18, 1986.

History 

Negros del Norte was established under Batas Pambansa Blg. 885 which provided for the creation of the new province comprising the cities of Cadiz (the capital), San Carlos and Silay, and the municipalities of Calatrava, Enrique B. Magalona (Saravia), Escalante, Manapla, Sagay, Salvador Benedicto, Toboso and Victorias. The creation of the new province was ratified on January 3, 1986.

The creation of this new province was, however, opposed by the Negros Anti-Partition Movement and, on July 11, 1986, the Supreme Court declared the creation of the province of Negros del Norte unconstitutional. The ruling stated that the enabling law was unconstitutional for, among other things, not including the rest of Negros Occidental in the plebiscite, and the proposed province not meeting the 3,500 square kilometre land area requirement of the 1983 Local Government Code.

It has been proposed that other municipalities should join the proposed province to fulfill the needed 3,500 square kilometre land area requirement before a plebiscite can take place.

Administrative divisions 

Negros del Norte was composed of eight municipalities and three cities:

Cities 

Cadiz (capital)
San Carlos
Silay

Municipalities 

Calatrava
Enrique B. Magalona (Saravia)
Escalante
Manapla
Sagay
Salvador Benedicto
Toboso
Victorias

See also 
Negros Occidental

References 

Former provinces of the Philippines
States and territories disestablished in 1986
History of Negros Occidental